Mugabi is a surname. Notable people with the surname include:

Bevis Mugabi (born 1995), English footballer
John Mugabi (born 1960), Ugandan boxer
Michael Mugabi, Ugandan lawyer and corporate executive
Susan Mugabi Nakaziba, Ugandan politician

See also
 Mugabe (disambiguation)

Surnames of African origin